Jang Yoon-jeong (born February 16, 1980) is a South Korean trot singer, commonly referred to as “The Queen of Trot”. Jang debuted in 1999 and became well-known in 2004 when her single "Eomeona!" ("Oh My Goodness!") topped the charts. The song is often credited with helping re-popularize trot music in South Korea. In 2017, a Gallup poll found that Jang was the third-most popular singer in the country. She often appears on the KBS 1TV 'Golden Oldies’, as well as other singing programmes.

Career
In April 2005, Jang debuted in Japan with the release of "Oh, My Goodness."

On April 5, she became new MC of KBS program Escaping Danger Number One. Her interview was spilled before the broadcast of Healing Camp, Aren't You Happy.

In August 2014, Jang signed with agency KOEN Stars, home to MCs Lee Hwi-jae and Lee Kyung-kyu, after her former agency Inwoo Production closed down.

Personal life
On June 29, 2013, Jang married news announcer Do Kyung-wan in Yeouido, Western Seoul. The couple welcomed son Yeon-woo on June 13, 2014, and later daughter Ha-young on November 8, 2018. From 2019 to 2022, the family was featured on popular reality series The Return of Superman.

Philanthropy 
In February 2023, Jang donated 100 million won to families of vulnerable children with disabilities, Because on her birthday.

Discography

Studio albums

Compilation albums

Soundtrack appearances

Filmography

Television series

Television shows

Web shows

Awards and nominations

State honors

Listicles

Notes

References

External links

1980 births
Living people
People from Chungju
South Korean women pop singers
Trot singers
South Korean Buddhists
Melon Music Award winners
Indong Jang clan
21st-century South Korean singers
21st-century South Korean women singers
Seoul Institute of the Arts alumni